Lub may refer to:

 Supremum, least upper bound
 Lub, Oman
 Liga Uruguaya de Basketball (LUB)